The 2013 Vodacom Cup was played between 9 March and 18 May 2013 and was the 16th edition of this annual domestic cup competition.

Competition
There ware sixteen teams participating in the 2013 Vodacom Cup competition. These teams were geographically divided into two sections, with eight teams in both the Northern and Southern Sections. Teams played all the teams in their section once over the course of the season, either at home or away.

Teams received four log points for a win and two points for a draw. Bonus log points were awarded to teams that scored four or more tries in a game, as well as to teams that lost a match by seven points or less. Teams were ranked by log points, then points difference (points scored less points conceded).

The top four teams in each section qualified for the title play-offs. In the quarter finals, the teams that finished first in each section had home advantage against the teams that finished fourth in that section and the teams that finished second in each section had home advantage against the teams that finished third in that section. The winners of these quarter finals then played each other in the semi-finals, with the higher placed team having home advantage. The two semi-final winners then met in the final.

Teams

Changes from 2012
 , despite being part of the  team, played as a separate team in 2013.

Team Listing
The following teams took part in the 2013 Vodacom Cup competition:

Fixtures and results
All times are South African (GMT+2).

Northern Section

Round one

Round two

Round three

Round four

Round Five

Round Six

Round Seven

Southern Section

Round one

Round two

Round three

Round four

Round Five

Round Six

Round Seven

Quarter finals

Semi-finals

Final

Winners

Players

Leading try scorers

<small>Source: South African Rugby Union

Leading point scorers

<small>Source: South African Rugby Union

See also
Vodacom Cup
2013 Currie Cup Premier Division
2013 Currie Cup First Division

External links

References

Vodacom Cup
2013 in South African rugby union
Vodacom Cup, 2013
2013 rugby union tournaments for clubs